Gordon William Cattrell (born 18 December 1954) is an English former professional footballer who made 102 appearances in the Football League playing as a midfielder for Darlington. He began his professional career as an apprentice with Leeds United, but never played for the first team, and after leaving Darlington he played non-league football for Bishop Auckland.

As a youngster, Cattrell represented Durham schools at under-15 level, and made four appearances for the England Schools under-15 team, including against West German Schoolboys at Roker Park, Sunderland, in May 1970.

References

1954 births
Living people
Footballers from Sunderland
English footballers
England schools international footballers
Association football midfielders
Leeds United F.C. players
Darlington F.C. players
Bishop Auckland F.C. players
English Football League players